The 1997 NCAA Division I Women's Lacrosse Championship was the 16th annual single-elimination tournament to determine the national champion of Division I NCAA women's college lacrosse. The championship game was played at Goodman Stadium in Bethlehem, Pennsylvania during May 1997. All NCAA Division I women's lacrosse programs were eligible for this championship. This year, the tournament field expanded from 6 to 8 teams, the first expansion since 1986.

Maryland defeated Loyola Maryland, 8–7, to win their fifth and third consecutive, national championship. This would subsequently become the third of Maryland's record seven straight national titles (1995–2001). 

The leading scorers for the tournament, each with 10 goals, were Amy Fine from North Carolina and Kerri Johnson from Loyola (MD). The Most Outstanding Player trophy was not awarded this year, although it would be reintroduced in 1998.

Teams

Tournament bracket

Tournament outstanding players 
Kerri Johnson, Loyola (MD)
Michelle Meyer, Loyola (MD)
Stephanie Roberts, Loyola (MD)
Allison Valentino, Loyola (MD)
Ginette Chelious, Maryland
Caryl Duckworth, Maryland
Sarah Forbes, Maryland
Alex Kahoe, Maryland
Ryan Laubach, Maryland
Cathy Nelson, Maryland
Sascha Newmarch, Maryland
Sarah Dacey, North Carolina
Melissa Michaels, Temple

See also
1997 NCAA Division I Men's Lacrosse Championship
1997 NCAA Division II Lacrosse Championship
1997 NCAA Division III Women's Lacrosse Championship

References

NCAA Division I Women's Lacrosse Championship
NCAA Division I Women's Lacrosse Championship
NCAA Women's Lacrosse Championship